The 2019 Czech Women's Curling Championship was held in Prague from April 4 to 8, 2019.

Four teams took part in the championship, with the top three promoted to the playoffs, which involved a best of three semifinal and final. 

The winners of the championship were the "Liboc 3" team (skip Anna Kubešková), who beat the "Zbraslav W" team in the final (skip Zuzana Paulová). Team "Savona H" (skip Linda Klímová) won the bronze medal.

The championship team represented the Czech Republic at the 2019 European Curling Championships, where they finished in 6th place.

Teams

Round Robin

Playoffs

Semifinal
April 7, 16:00 UTC+1

Final 1
April 8, 10:00 UTC+1

Final 2
April 8, 16:00 UTC+1

Final standings

References

See also
2019 Czech Mixed Doubles Curling Championship

Czech Women's Curling Championship
Czech Women's Curling Championship
Curling Women's Championship
Czech Women's Curling Championship
Sports competitions in Prague
2019 in Czech women's sport
2019 in women's curling